Sânmartin is a commune in Bihor County, Crișana, Romania with a population of 9,572  people. It is the site of two spas, Băile 1 Mai and Băile Felix.

Villages
The commune is composed of six villages: Betfia (Betfia), Cihei (Váradcsehi), Cordău (Kardó), Haieu (Hájó), Rontău (Rontó) and Sânmartin.

Rontău
Rontău is a small village belonging to Sânmartin commune. 

The village is located close to the city of Oradea, the county seat. The village is usually considered to be part of Oradea, even though it is not a quarter or district of the urban proper, but is rather administered as part of the Sînmartin commune. 

Rontău is about halfway between Oradea and Băile Felix. The village is accessible by train from Oradea and Băile Felix. It is also accessible by selected bus services from the above-mentioned places.

Notable residents
 Ioan Ciordaș (1877–1919), Romanian lawyer and activist
 Zoltán Ozoray Schenker (1880–1966), Hungarian Olympic champion saber fencer

References

Communes in Bihor County
Localities in Crișana